Modest Mouse is an American rock band formed in 1993 in Issaquah, Washington, and currently based in Portland, Oregon. The founding members were lead singer/guitarist Isaac Brock, drummer Jeremiah Green and bassist Eric Judy. Strongly influenced by Pavement, Pixies, XTC, and Talking Heads, they rehearsed, rearranged, and recorded demos for almost two years before finally signing with small-town indie label K Records and releasing numerous singles. The band achieved mainstream success with their fourth album, Good News for People Who Love Bad News (2004), and its singles "Float On" and "Ocean Breathes Salty".

From their 1996 debut album This Is a Long Drive for Someone with Nothing to Think About onwards, the band's lineup mostly centered on Brock and Green, undergoing multiple changes. As of 2023, Brock is the only original member of the band. Judy performed on every Modest Mouse album until his departure in 2012. Guitarist Johnny Marr (formerly of the Smiths) joined the band in 2006, shortly following percussionist Joe Plummer (formerly of the Black Heart Procession) and multi-instrumentalist Tom Peloso, to work on the album We Were Dead Before the Ship Even Sank (2007). Guitarist Jim Fairchild joined the band in 2009. The band's sixth album Strangers to Ourselves (subtitled "The Golden Casket Vol. 1") was released in 2015 and their seventh, The Golden Casket, in 2021.

History

Formation and early years: 1992–1999 
When Isaac Brock was a teenager, he was employed at a local family video store just outside Seattle, where he met bassist Eric Judy. Brock and Judy later discovered drummer Jeremiah Green, who also resided near Seattle, at a heavy metal show, at which point they decided to make music together. Brock says he made a point of the band being from Issaquah to avoid association with the music scenes of Seattle or Olympia and to keep with the band's suburban lyrical themes. In 1994, at Calvin Johnson's Dub Narcotic Studios, Modest Mouse recorded its first EP, Blue Cadet-3, Do You Connect?, which was released by K Records. This was followed by a single, "Broke", recorded by Steve Wold (a.k.a. bluesman Seasick Steve) under Sub Pop records at Moon Studios in Olympia, Washington. During this time, Modest Mouse also recorded what would have been its first album, Sad Sappy Sucker, but constant delays caused the album to be shelved and forgotten. It was not until 2001 that it was officially released. Before the band made its way into the pop music world in 2004, many of Modest Mouse's tours included stops at DIY/punk venues such as Speak in Tongues in Cleveland, Ohio, where they continued to play even after becoming popular enough to fill larger venues.

After moving to Up Records, Modest Mouse released two full-length albums and other recordings including the 1996 LP This Is a Long Drive for Someone with Nothing to Think About. Steve Wold also recorded and produced this album (and at the time was assisting in the recordings as well, but was not officially part of the band) along with the next offering, Interstate 8. The 1997 album, The Lonesome Crowded West (also recorded at Moon Studios, by Scott Swayze) served as the band's breakthrough. The Lonesome Crowded West gained the band a cult following, and is now popularly considered to be one of the defining albums of mid-1990s indie rock. During this time, Nick Kraft became involved with the task of refining the band's sound. Prior to its release, the band had recorded the EP The Fruit That Ate Itself. In 2000, Up Records released a singles and rarities collection entitled Building Nothing Out of Something that included the entirety of Interstate 8 except for the songs "Edit the Sad Parts" and "Buttons to Push the Buttons".

Critical success: 2000–2002 
In 2000, Modest Mouse released The Moon & Antarctica, its first album on Epic Records. The album, produced by Califone's Brian Deck during five months of sessions in Chicago, was met with critical acclaim, including a 9.8/10 score from online music magazine Pitchfork Media, despite concerns about releasing material on a major label. The album would later receive further acclaim.

The band licensed "Gravity Rides Everything" for a Nissan Quest minivan advertisement, a move that Brock has publicly acknowledged as blatantly commercial but necessary to achieve financial stability. Regarding the commercial, Brock stated, "People who don't have to make their living playing music can bitch about my principles while they spend their parents' money or wash dishes for some asshole."

In 2001, Modest Mouse released the EP Everywhere and His Nasty Parlour Tricks, a collection of unused songs from the recording sessions of The Moon & Antarctica. In 2002, the band joined Cake, De La Soul, The Flaming Lips, The Hackensaw Boys and Kinky on the Unlimited Sunshine Tour.

Mainstream success, Johnny Marr joins the band: 2003–2009 

In March 2003, Green left the band after suffering a nervous breakdown; official reports stated he was leaving to work with his side project, Vells. The same year, he and Judy appeared on Adam Forkner's first solo album, VVRSSNN. Drummer Benjamin Weikel joined the band, replacing Green, along with Murder City Devils guitarist Dann Gallucci, who had previously played with Modest Mouse. Prior to starting the band's writing and recording process, Brock was devastated by the loss of "a couple of the most important people in my life," he said. Following these events, the band released their fourth album, Good News for People Who Love Bad News, on April 6, 2004. The following August, the album was certified Platinum, having two hits with "Float On" and "Ocean Breathes Salty" (both of which they performed on Saturday Night Live on November 13, 2004). The album was nominated for a Grammy Award for Best Alternative Music Album that year, and "Float On" was nominated for Best Rock Song. Green officially rejoined the band in May 2004, while Weikel returned to drumming exclusively for the Helio Sequence.

The public radio program Marketplace used "Float On" as bumper music, which helped propel the group to a broader audience.

In 2006, Johnny Marr (formerly of The Smiths) joined the band after Gallucci quit amicably. Modest Mouse released their next album, We Were Dead Before the Ship Even Sank, on March 20, 2007 after its original release date of December 19, 2006 was delayed. The album also included bonus track and single "King Rat", which actor Heath Ledger had known about before the track was released; the band was formally introduced to the actor while on their 2007 tour in Australia. Ledger proposed an outline for a music video to the group, and with his film collective, The Masses, immediately began working on it once he had the band's approval. Upon Ledger's death in January 2008, the video remained unfinished. We Were Dead Before the Ship Even Sank was the first Modest Mouse album to reach No. 1 on the US Billboard 200 charts and had the hit single "Dashboard", as well as "Missed the Boat" and "We've Got Everything". Modest Mouse released singles for the songs "Satellite Skin", "Autumn Beds" and "Perpetual Motion Machine" in limited edition—a total of 4,000 copies each—vinyl 7 inches, featuring artwork by art director and illustrator Joshua Marc Levy, J. Alex Stamos, and Natasha Wheat.

The band began a North American tour in June 2008. They returned to Florida, with three shows in Miami, Orlando and St. Augustine, for the first time since they were cut off stage early during the November 2006 Bang Music Festival show. Modest Mouse finished its tour supporting We Were Dead Before the Ship Even Sank after two years of promoting the record.

Jim Fairchild replaced Marr as official guitarist after the latter left the band and joined The Cribs, beginning with the tour of No One's First and You're Next, which was released on August 4, 2009, composed of unreleased tracks from the recording sessions of Good News for People Who Love Bad News and We Were Dead Before the Ship Even Sank.

Touring, lineup changes, and re-releases: 2010–2014 
In 2010, The Moon & Antarctica was re-released on vinyl as part of Record Store Day.

On July 4, 2010 the band headlined the second day of the 80/35 Music Festival in Des Moines, Iowa, and the first day of the End of the Road Festival in Dorset, England, on September 10, 2010. At the end of August 2010, Modest Mouse played on the main stage at the Leeds and Reading festivals.

On May 29, Modest Mouse played two new songs during their headline of the Sasquatch festival. The songs were called "Poison the Well" and "Lampshades on Fire".
They then contributed a cover of the Buddy Holly song "That'll Be the Day" to the compilation Rave On Buddy Holly, which was released on June 28, 2011. Modest Mouse played at Splendour in the Grass in Woodford, Queensland on July 29, 2011, and at The Warfield in San Francisco on January 25, 2012.

In 2012, Modest Mouse underwent a significant lineup change, which included the departure of founding bassist Eric Judy and percussionist Joe Plummer, replaced by Russell Higbee (formerly of Man Man) and Davey Brozowski, respectively. The lineup also included the additions of multi-instrumentalist and vocalist Lisa Molinaro, and percussionist Ben Massarella, the latter of whom previously played percussion on The Moon & Antarctica.

In June of that same year, Pitchfork.tv released a 45-minute documentary on The Lonesome Crowded West, which included archival footage taken during live performances and original recording/mix sessions.

Modest Mouse played a Saturday afternoon set at the inaugural Firefly Music Festival in July 2012. Modest Mouse was one of the main acts in the Good Vibes Festival held in Sepang, Malaysia on August 17, 2013. The lineup featured other internationally renowned bands such as Smashing Pumpkins, Ash, and Japandroids. In April 2013, Modest Mouse performed at Coachella Music Festival in Indio, California. They also performed at the 2014 Hangout Music Festival in Gulf Shores, Alabama, in May 2014. They later performed as a headliner at Shaky Knees music festival in Atlanta, Georgia on May 10, 2014, and also headlined Sunday May 25 at Boston Calling in Massachusetts. Modest Mouse then performed at Hudson Valley Music Project in Saugerties, NY in July, 2014. The band's final performance of 2014 took place in Inglewood, California during the annual KROQ Almost Acoustic Christmas.

In the fall of 2014 Modest Mouse re-released their first two albums, This Is a Long Drive for Someone with Nothing to Think About and The Lonesome Crowded West, on CD and vinyl through Isaac Brock's Glacial Pace record label.

Strangers to Ourselves and The Golden Casket: 2015–present
Eight years after the release of We Were Dead Before the Ship Even Sank, Modest Mouse released Strangers to Ourselves on March 17, 2015. On December 15, 2014, they released the lead single "Lampshades on Fire" which debuted on Twin Cities public radio station 89.3 The Current. On December 16, 2014, Modest Mouse made Strangers to Ourselves available for pre-order for CD and LP formats on the Glacial Pace website and on the iTunes store. 

In 2015, Brock described the follow-up album to Strangers to Ourselves as being like a part two to the latter album that they would try to release as soon as legally possible. The follow-up album has also been said to feature at least one song with Nirvana bassist Krist Novoselic. 

Throughout 2019, the band released three standalone singles; "Poison the Well" on March 29, "I'm Still Here" on April 18, and "Ice Cream Party" on November 15.

Modest Mouse released their seventh studio album, The Golden Casket, on June 25, 2021. The album's first single, "We Are Between", was released on May 5, followed by its second single, “Leave a Light On”, released on May 24. Writing for the Wall Street Journal, music critic Mark Richardson gave a mixed review of the album. Richardson described the tracks on the first half of the album as "sound[ing] like busy arrangements in search of a song," and noted that "Mr. Brock’s ear for hooks just barely rescues the tracks from the seriously overstuffed production." Richardson noted that the back half of the album contained the biggest highlights, which he described as "quite good." Richardson was particularly fond of the album's stripped-down finale, "Back to the Middle," which he noted "hints at what should be [the band's] next change-up: Keep it simple. If the songs are strong and the performances are there, guitar, bass and drums will be more than enough.

In an interview in 2022, celebrating 15 years of We Were Dead before The Ship Even Sank, Isaac Brock and Johnny Marr revealed that they were writing songs together again, the first of which is called "Rivers of Rivers". The writing took place in a "pen pal" kind of way, with Brock saying that there were more songs to be developed in 2022 together "once the world tilts back on its axis".

The band is currently mixing a nine-song companion EP to The Golden Casket, with Marr confirmed to appear on one of the tracks.

In the midst of a tour celebrating the 25th anniversary of The Lonesome Crowded West, drummer and founding member Jeremiah Green took an unannounced leave of absence. Days after his Stage IV oral cancer diagnosis was revealed to the public, Green passed away on December 31, 2022.

Members

Current members
Main instruments listed only

 Isaac Brock – lead vocals, rhythm and lead guitar (1993–present)
 Tom Peloso – upright bass, backing vocals, bass guitar, horns (2003–present); keyboards (2005–present); fiddle (2003–2005, 2021-present)
 Russell Higbee – bass guitar, rhythm guitar, keyboards, backing vocals (2012–present)
 Ben Massarella – percussion, effects (2014–present)
 Simon O'Connor – lead guitar, backing vocals (2021–present)

Current touring musicians
 Damon Cox – drums, percussion (2022–present)

Former members
 Jeremiah Green – drums, percussion (1993–2003, 2004–2022; died 2022)
 Eric Judy – bass guitar, acoustic guitar, backing vocals (1993–1994, 1995–2012), rhythm guitar (2003–2012)
 John Wickhart – bass guitar (1994–1995)
 Dann Gallucci –  lead guitar, organ, backing vocals (1994–1995, 1997–1998, 2002–2005)
 Benjamin Weikel – drums, percussion (2003–2004)
 Joe Plummer – percussion, drums (2004–2012)
 Jim Fairchild – lead guitar, backing vocals (2005–2006, 2009–2021)
 Johnny Marr – lead guitar (2006–2008)
 Lisa Molinaro – viola, bass guitar, keyboards, backing vocals (2011–2021)
 Davey Brozowski – percussion, drums (2012–2021)

Former touring musicians
 Tyler Reilly – violin (1997–2000)
 Robin Peringer – lead guitar, keyboards, effects (2000–2002)
 Brandon Angle – bass guitar, acoustic guitar, pump organ (2007)
 Andy MacLeod – bass guitar, acoustic guitar, pump organ (2007)
 Russell Higbee - horns (2010-2012)
 Dave Collis – lead guitar (2013)
 Darrin Wiener – effects, keyboards (2014–2021)

Timeline

Discography

Studio albums
This Is a Long Drive for Someone with Nothing to Think About (1996)
The Lonesome Crowded West (1997)
The Moon & Antarctica (2000)
Good News for People Who Love Bad News (2004)
We Were Dead Before the Ship Even Sank (2007)
Strangers to Ourselves (2015)
The Golden Casket (2021)

References

Further reading

External links 

 Official Modest Mouse website
 
 
 

Indie rock musical groups from Washington (state)
Musical groups established in 1993
K Records artists
Sub Pop artists
Issaquah, Washington
1993 establishments in Washington (state)
Suicide Squeeze Records artists
Epic Records artists
Matador Records artists